Putrudu in Telugu language means Son.

 Devi Putrudu is a 2001 Telugu film directed by Kodi Ramakrishna. 
 Lakshmi Putrudu is a 2008 Telugu film.